Boyd Henry Bode (October 4, 1873 – March 29, 1953) was an American academic and philosopher, notable for his work on philosophy of education.

Bode was born in Ridott, Illinois. He grew up in rural areas of Iowa and South Dakota and attended Pennsylvania College in Iowa and later the University of Michigan, where he graduated with a Bachelor of Arts degree in 1897, and Cornell University, where he received his Ph.D. in 1900.

Bode became assistant professor of philosophy at the University of Wisconsin–Madison (1900-1909) and was later appointed professor of philosophy at University of Illinois at Urbana-Champaign (1909-1921). In 1910 Bode published An Outline of Logic.

In 1921 Bode became professor of education at Ohio State University. There Bode wrote on philosophy of education and authored Fundamentals of Education (1921), Modern Educational Theories (1927), Conflicting Psychologies of Learning (1929), Democracy as a Way of Life (1937), Progressive Education at the Crossroads (1938), and How We Learn (1940). He agreed with many of the ideas of John Dewey, especially on pragmatism. Bode retired in 1944. He died in 1953 in Gainesville, Florida.

From 1911 to 1912 Bode served as vice president of the American Philosophical Association.

Life

Boyd Bode was the son of Henry Bode and Gertrude Weinenga.  His father was a minister of the First Christian Reformed Church and he also farmed.  In 1848, his family was part of a religious migration of Germans to the United States.  In the 1870s his family bought farm land and moved to Iowa.  Bode had seven younger brothers and sisters and he was the only one to pursue an education.  He earned his degree in 1896 from William Penn College in Oskaloosa, Iowa.  Bode achieved another A.B. at the University of Michigan.  He then earned his Ph.D. at Cornell University in 1900.  Bode married Bernice Ballard and had two children in 1903.  
Bode’s realistic approach to educational philosophy mimicked that of John Dewey.  From 1900 to 1909 he was a professor of philosophy and philosophy of education at the University of Wisconsin.  He left Wisconsin and moved to Illinois to become involved in the university’s department of education.  While at the University of Illinois he published An Outline of Logic, which in the field of philosophy, launched him into becoming a young scholar.  
Bode received a great compliment and was asked to come to Ohio State University to become a professor in education and head the Department of Principles and Practices of Education.  This was his first time not teaching philosophy and instead education.  However, he continued preaching the philosopher’s cynicism and concern for logic while teaching education.  Instead of a typical lecture during class, Bode approached a different way of teaching by questioning and challenging his students.  He was very well liked by his colleagues and this is shown in a quote from Ralph Tyler who worked with him at Ohio State University, “My admiration for his keen intelligence, his persistent questioning, and his ready wit led me to become a good friend of Bode’s.”  This quote shows just how well liked and admired Bode was for his significance to education.  
In 1927, he came out with another triumphant publication titled Modern Educational Theories.  Bode felt school and education was to be the establishments which allowed social equality to become a way of life.  He made this clear in two more publications titled Democracy as a Way of Life and Progressive Education at the Crossroads.  Bode retired in 1944 and had several bridge jobs taking positions in Cairo, Egypt, and several universities as a teacher.  In 1946 he accepted an offer of being the graduate lecturer in philosophy at the University of Florida where he spent the rest of his life until his death in 1953.

References

External links
 
 
Master's thesis about Bode's life and work
Article in Time magazine about Bode

1873 births
1953 deaths
Cornell University alumni
William Penn University alumni
University of Wisconsin–Madison faculty
University of Illinois Urbana-Champaign faculty
Ohio State University faculty
Philosophers of education
20th-century American philosophers
University of Michigan alumni